Ryan's Mystery Playdate is an American children's television series created by Albie Hecht and produced by the company PocketWatch that aired on Nickelodeon from April 19, 2019 to November 4, 2021. The series is based on the Ryan's World YouTube channel, which signed an advertising deal with PocketWatch in 2017.

In an attempt by PocketWatch to match the YouTube channel's style, all of the show's dialogue is improvised, and the only scripted segments are scene transitions and explanations of the challenges.

Overview
The series focuses on Ryan, his parents, and two animated characters named Gus the Gummy Gator and Combo Panda. Episodes show a selection of physical challenges and unboxing puzzles.

Production
The show's first 20 episodes were announced as part of Nickelodeon's 2019 content slate on February 14, 2019. On April 24, 2019, the series was renewed for a second season of 20 episodes, bringing a total of 40 episodes for the series. On February 24, 2020, the series was renewed for a third season of 20 episodes, bringing a total of 60 episodes for the series. On June 30, 2020, the series was renewed for a fourth season, initially consisting of 10 episodes. On September 24, 2021, the season was given an additional 20-episode order, bringing a total of 90 episodes for the series.

On December 16, 2020, it was announced that PocketWatch had presold the series to various broadcasters around the world, including e-Junior and Spacetoon in the Middle East.

Episodes

References

External links 
 
 

2010s American children's television series
2010s preschool education television series
2019 American television series debuts
2020s American children's television series
2020s preschool education television series
2021 American television series endings
American preschool education television series
American television series with live action and animation
English-language television shows
Nick Jr. original programming
Television series about children
Television series about families
Television series based on Internet-based works